The Open University of Israel (Ha-Universita ha-Ptuha) is a distance-education university in Israel.  It is one of ten public universities in Israel recognized by the Council of Higher Education (CHE). The Open University is unique in that it does not require a matriculation certificate, psychometric exam, or other entrance exam for admission to undergraduate studies.

Open University teaching methods are based primarily on distance learning technologies, with the option of face-to-face tutorial sessions. Campuses are located in Ra'anana, Tel Aviv, Jerusalem, Haifa, Beersheba, Givat Haviva, and Nazareth, in addition to approximately fifty study centers located throughout the country. Most students study remotely from their homes in Israel and around the world. As in other higher education institutions, graduation from the OUI is contingent upon successfully fulfilling degree requirements; English-language proficiency is also required. The university offers bachelor's degrees, as well as a number of master's degree programs, and a doctoral program in Education: Technologies in Learning Systems. Acceptance requirements to master's programs are similar to those at most universities.

History

In 1971, a committee appointed by the CHE and chaired by Professor Shneior Lifson proposed the establishment of a distance learning university, following the model of the Open University UK. The Edmond de Rothschild Foundation (Israel) endorsed the idea and offered to fund its establishment, based on the recommendation of a committee of experts chaired by Professor Wilbur Schramm of Stanford University. The proposal was introduced to the Minister of Education and Culture at the time, Yigal Allon. Under his leadership, in 1973, the government and the CHE decided to establish a “university for all.” In 1988 the university changed its name from Everyman's University to The Open University of Israel.
In 1976, the Open University began operating from its headquarters in Ramat Aviv, with an enrollment of 2,267 students. Five courses were initially offered. The university had 130 employees, including nine senior academic faculty members and 31 teaching faculty (including course coordinators and tutors). 
An agreement signed in 1995 between the university and the Ra’anana municipality led to construction of the Dorothy de Rothschild campus. In 2004, construction was completed and university headquarters were relocated to the new main campus in Ra’anana.

Academics

Academic departments
The Open University has seven academic departments:
 History, Philosophy and Judaic Studies
 Language, Literature, and the Arts
 Mathematics and Computer Science
 Natural and Life Sciences
 Management and Economics
 Sociology, Political Science, and Communication
 Education and Psychology

Study method
Studies towards a degree at the Open University are structured on a course-by-course basis, rather than year-by-year or program based, as in traditional universities. All courses are designed for independent study, using textbooks and online learning materials produced specifically for the OUI. Course websites feature additional study materials, technological aids, and forums for consulting with academic faculty and other students. Students have the option of attending in-person or online tutorials for review of study material.
Course coordinators manage all aspects of the courses they teach, including assignment and exam development, and monitoring of course websites. Tutors review material in weekly or bi-weekly tutorials and grade assignments.

Study programs
Courses are clustered into study programs. In order to graduate, students must accumulate the full credits required for a degree (usually 120 credits). The OUI offers bachelor's, master's, doctoral, and diploma study programs. Students may pursue a general undergraduate degree in the humanities or social sciences, or a degree in a specific discipline. In most disciplines, degrees are either single or dual-disciplinary. Currently, the OUI offers one PhD program.

Transfer tracks
A credit transfer program, in conjunction with other top Israeli universities, allows students to begin their studies at the OUI without admission requirements and demonstrate scholastic success. Students who successfully complete a cluster of OUI courses (according to specific study program requirements), are generally accepted as transfer students to any traditional university in Israel.

The Research Authority
The Dean of Research heads the Research Authority (RA) and the OUI research institutes, and oversees research ethics.
The RA helps facilitate the presentation of  research proposals to competitive funding bodies and the publication of research studies in journals and other scholarly publications. The RA manages research budgets, physical infrastructure, and personnel. It formulates agreements with other academic institutions to host OUI researchers who require specialized research infrastructure not available at the OUI, and advances partnerships between OUI researchers and colleagues in other universities.
A steering committee composed of five senior faculty members and headed by the dean of research operates alongside the RA.

OpMop Ltd.
OpMop Ltd., founded in 2008, is a technology transfer subsidiary of the OUI that files patents for OUI faculty members and assists with all intellectual property matters related to research and technology development.

Research institutes
OUI research institutes provide a framework for interdisciplinary research in a variety of fields, and forge reciprocal and cross-departmental collaborations. The centers provide support for researchers as they generate new scientific knowledge, and foster collaboration and programming with colleagues in Israel and abroad.

Institute for Policy Analysis
The Institute for Policy Analysis promotes research on theoretical, empirical, and applied subjects related to policy design and implementation, and social, political, and economic processes and mechanisms. The institute focuses on policy analysis and contemporary social issues.

Research Center for Innovation in Learning Technologies
The Research Center for Innovation in Learning Technologies explores the integration of new educational technologies in study methods. The center encourages research by OUI faculty aimed at improving the understanding of teaching and learning processes in technology-rich environments, and the integration of innovative technologies in the teaching of academic courses, particularly at the OUI. The center works in close cooperation with the Shoham Center for Technology in Distance Education.

The Institute for the Study of Relations between Jews, Christians, and Muslims
The institute supports research groups and organizes events related to topics of interest to the public that enhance the understanding and relationship between the three Abrahamic religions.

Astrophysics Research Center (ARCO)
The center functions as a scientific, institutional, and applied hub for the research of theoretical, observational, and empirical topics and issues in astrophysics, including cosmology, relativist gravity and planetary science.

Open Media and Information Lab (OMILab)
OMILab serves as a base for multidisciplinary digital projects. It facilitates partnerships between researchers from different disciplines, such as sociology, computer science, management, communications, education, psychology, and digital humanities.

Academic Development and Publishing
The Academic Development and Publishing Department manages and monitors course development from start to finish, and publishes course books and related materials. Development is carried out in teams composed of faculty members, pedagogic and technological advisors, editors, graphic designers, film directors, and scriptwriters.
The OUI publishes under two imprints: Lamda Scholarship, and Lamda Books.
Lamda Scholarship was founded in 2013 as a platform for publishing innovative research-based Hebrew books in the humanities and social sciences. The university provides comprehensive peer-review, editing and design services. 
Lamda Scholarship secures publishing grants for selected books from various foundations, and is a member of the Israeli Association of Book Publishers.
Lamda Books publishes OUI textbooks which are sold in commercial bookstores countrywide, as well as online and in the Ra’anana campus bookstore. The books serve OUI students as well as students in other academic institutions throughout Israel.

Journals
The OUI publishes two Hebrew-language academic journals, Kriot Yisraeliot (Israeli readings) is a digital, multidisciplinary journal which focuses on empirical and theoretical issues relevant to Israeli society and Zmanim., is a history quarterly, co-published with Tel Aviv University and the Historical Society of Israel.

The Shoham Center for Technology in Distance Education
The Shoham center develops and implements technology-based pedagogic solutions for producing and teaching courses. Some of the realms of development include the OPAL online learning environment, online exam systems, assistance in exam design, learning analytics, state-of-the-art video studios for live broadcasts, and educational video production and filmed courses.

Resource Development and External Relations
The resource development and external relations department develops relationships with donors in Israel and abroad, and fundraises for OUI programs and scholarships. The American Friends of the Open University of Israel was formed in the early 1980s. In 2017, the Israeli and British associations of Friends of the Open University were founded in Israel.
In 2018, Friends associations were founded in France and Switzerland. The university has also benefited from Latin American support since 2017.

Students
More than 50,000 students are currently enrolled in the Open University. In addition to a typical student population, the OUI also attracts under-resourced communities, due to its flexible study system and focus on student support. The OUI is popular with mature students who combine studies with full-time employment, high school students, who take university courses in lieu of high school matriculation courses through the Academia in High School program, and conscripts combining university studies with military service. In addition, the university has support systems in place to assist students studying from abroad, and students with disabilities.

Student Association
The Open University's student association provides services and activities in order to improve the university experience of its diverse student population. The association's academic department has instituted several projects to support students in their studies. The scholarship and social engagement department promotes volunteering in non-profit organizations such as the SAHAR mental health association, and the LATET organization for humanitarian aid. The association tailors its efforts to the needs of the student body.

External studies
The External Studies Center offers inservice training, and enrichment and professional development in a variety of fields.

Professional development for educators
The Professional Development Unit offers professional development opportunities for educators in the wider teaching community and facilitates processes of educational and technological innovation in schools throughout the country.

Ascolot School of Interdisciplinary Studies
The Ascolot School of Interdisciplinary Studies offers courses in the arts, music, sciences, Judaic studies, literature, philosophy, law and history. Three long-established forums provide informative lectures to the wider community: Government and Strategy: Intelligence and National Security, and economic and legal forums.

Hasifa School of Communication, Television and Multimedia
Offers several study tracks, some of which grant credit towards an undergraduate degree.

Tafnit School of Continuing Education for Managers
Training for managers, CEOs, human resource managers, as well as courses in information science, business mentoring, and life-coaching.

Diploma School of Certificate Studies
Professional training in design, tourism and bookkeeping and prepares students for certification exams in these fields.

DiAlog School of Languages
Language courses in nine different languages for various organizations and for Israeli diplomats.

Meirav School for Complementary Medicine
Trains practitioners in a variety of complementary therapies.

University management

Presidents

Vice Presidents for Academic Affairs

Director Generals
 Ehud Or - 1991–1996
 Giora Ullmann - 1996–2004
 David Klibanski - 2004–2009
 Amit Streit - 2009–2020
 Ruth Shoham - 2021–present

See also
List of Israeli universities and colleges

References

External links

Open University of Israel Web site

 
Educational institutions established in 1974
Education in Israel
Universities in Israel
1974 establishments in Israel